MacFarlan Smith is a pharmaceutical research company based in Edinburgh, Scotland, founded in 1815. It is part of the Fine Chemical and Catalysts division of Johnson Matthey.

Background

J.F. Macfarlan
J.F. Macfarlan Ltd was founded in 1780 as an apothecary supplier. In 1815 John Fletcher Macfarlan, licentiate of the Royal College of Surgeons, became the owner of the family business, and acquired an apothecary's shop in Edinburgh. He immediately began to manufacture laudanum, a medicine based on opium. In 1830 Macfarlan began a partnership with his former apprentice David Rennie Brown, and so incorporated the business as J.F. Macfarlan and Co Ltd. In 1832 the company began manufacture of morphine acetate (the medicinal version of heroin) and hydrochloride, which led to the development and manufacture of the anaesthetics ether and chloroform. This allowed the company to develop sterile dressings for Joseph Lister, 1st Baron Lister under contract. After acquiring the Abbeyhill chemical works in 1840 for the production of alkaloids, from 1870 the production of codeine began in 1886. The company then acquired another site in Northfield, Edinburgh, in 1900 for the production of strychnine.

Duncan Flockhart
John Duncan was born in Kinross in 1780. After serving a five-year apprenticeship in Edinburgh, he moved directly to London, before returning to Perth in 1806 to establish a chemists shop.

After expanding to Edinburgh in 1820, Duncan dissolved the partnership with the Perth shop and started a new partnership in Edinburgh with William Flockhart (also from Kinross), which in 1833 was called Duncan & Flockhart, incorporated three years later. Following the death of John Duncan (c. 1839) the firm was taken over by his son Dr James Duncan. In the same year the firm began to manufacture lactucarium, and from 1847 supplied Chloroform to Sir James Simpson. The firm expanded, and supplied chloroform to both the British Army, Royal Navy and British Red Cross during both world wars. After the start of World War I, the company established a drug growing farm at Warriston, to assure supply.

T&H Smith
T&H Smith was established as a chemists at 21-23 Duke Street, Edinburgh in 1827, by Thomas Smith and his brother Henry. On 13 April 1839, just three months after Henry Fox Talbot had announced his photogenic drawing process, T&H Smith placed an advert in The Scotsman offering photographic paper and chemicals. In 1840, having bought Blandfields Chemicals in Canongate and moved into their premises, the company developed the first liquid essence of coffee, later supplemented by creating various carbonated beverage flavours. Having opened a London branch in 1848, in 1851 the company discovered Aloin. But the company fortunes were made from 1855, when the first Morphine injection was developed. T&H Smith was the first company to produce commercial quantities of Apomorphine, and then Diamorphine in 1887. In 1906 the company moved from Canongate to the suburban outskirts of Edinburgh at Gorgie. In 1919, T&H Smith bought Glasgow Apothecaries. In 1926, the company acquired John Mackay Chemicals, subsequently incorporating its associated subsidiaries in Australia, Canada and New Zealand.

Foundation
In 1962, T&H Smith bought Duncan Flockhart, and then merged with along J.F Macfarlan to form Edinburgh Pharmaceuticals. In 1965 the Glaxo Group bought Edinburgh Pharmaceuticals, rebranding it Macfarlan Smith Ltd.

In 1958, while trying to develop dental anesthetic Lignocaine, the company had discovered the bitterest known substance, Denatonium.  Developed as a denaturant for industrial alcohol, in the 1970s it was commercial marketed as Bitrex, a safety additive for household products such as liquid detergents. Tesco was the first supermarket to display the Bitrex brand on their products.

In 1963 the company reproduced Etorphine, in a research group led by Professor Kenneth Bentley.

Bought through a management buy out in 1990, Macfarlan Smith was floated on the London Stock Exchange in 1993 under the holding company Meconic, the Greek language word for poppy.

Present
In 2001, Johnson Matthey plc bought Meconic, and merged it into its Fine Chemical and Catalysts division.

In late 2006, the British government permitted MacFarlan Smith to cultivate opium poppies in the United Kingdom for medicinal reasons, in response to increasing global prices for concentrate of poppy straw, the company's main raw material. A major opium poppy field is based in Didcot, England. As of 2012 they were growing in Dorset, Hampshire, Oxfordshire & Lincolnshire as a spring sown breakcrop recognised under the single payment scheme farm subsidy. The Office of Fair Trading has alerted the government to their monopoly position on growing in the UK and worldwide production of diamorphine and recommended consideration. The government's response advocated the status quo, being concerned interference might cause the company to stop production.

The British government has since contradicted the Home Office's suggestion that opium cultivation can be legalized in Afghanistan for exports to the United Kingdom, helping lower poverty and internal fighting whilst helping the National Health Service to meet the high demand for morphine and heroin. Opium poppy cultivation in the United Kingdom does not need a licence, but a licence is required for those wishing to extract opium for medicinal products.

Macfarlan Smith is now one of the world's leading manufacturer of opiate alkaloids. Together with sister companies within the Johnson Matthey group, they can provide full spectrum drug development, from drug discovery through to bulk production.

References

External links
 Company website
 Bitrex website

British companies established in 1815
1815 establishments in Scotland
Gorgie
Companies based in Edinburgh
Pharmaceutical companies of Scotland
Companies formerly listed on the London Stock Exchange
GSK plc
Pharmaceutical companies established in 1815